Adron Tennell (born September 11, 1987) is an American football wide receiver who is currently a free agent. He played college football at Oklahoma. He was considered one of the top wide receiver recruits in 2006.

Early life
Tennell attended Irving High School in Irving, Texas. There, he was a standout member of the football team being ranked as the No. 7 recruit at the wide receiver position.

Tennell committed to the University of Oklahoma on July 21, 2005. Tennell chose Oklahoma over football scholarships from Mississippi State, Oklahoma State, SMU, TCU, Texas A&M & Texas Tech.

College career
Tennell played four seasons for the Sooners, and he started his last year there.

Professional career

Spokane Shock

2011
Tennell signed with the Spokane Shock of the Arena Football League before the 2011 season.

2012
Tennell remained a member of the Shock during the 2012 season.

2013
Tennell had a big season for the Shock, earning 1st Team All-Arena honors, leading the league in both receptions (156) and receiving touchdowns (49). In addition, Tennell was named the AFL's Wide Receiver of the Year.

2014
Tennell missed most of the 2014 season with an injury.

San Jose SaberCats
On November 21, 2014, Tennell was assigned to the San Jose SaberCats.

References

External links
Spokane Shock bio
Oklahoma Sooners bio

1987 births
Living people
American football wide receivers
Oklahoma Sooners football players
Spokane Shock players
San Jose SaberCats players